Arlo Hanlin Hemphill (born October 7, 1971) is an American wilderness advocate. His educational background is in marine biology. Hemphill is a Fellow National of the Explorers Club and has been listed in Nature (Myers et al. 2000) as one of 100+ global biodiversity experts, credited for his expertise pertaining to the Greater Caribbean and the Tumbes-Chocó-Magdalena biodiversity hotspots.  He is best known for his involvement in regional-scale ocean conservation and was a founding steering committee member of the Deep Sea Conservation Coalition, the Forum for the Conservation of the Patagonian Sea and Areas of Influence, and the Sargasso Sea Alliance.

References

External links
Arlo Hanlin Hemphill - Personal website

1971 births
Living people
American conservationists
Palm Beach Atlantic University alumni
Nova Southeastern University alumni
Male actors from Baltimore
American marine biologists
American oceanographers
American naturalists
Fellows of the Explorers Club